The Salzburg Easter Festival (German: Osterfestspiele Salzburg) is an annual festival of opera and classical music held in Salzburg, Austria during Easter week.
 
For most of the festival's history, the resident orchestra of the Easter Festival has been the Berlin Philharmonic Orchestra, of which Karajan was music director at the time, with Karajan also serving as the Easter Festival's artistic director. The orchestra continued its involvement with the festival through the subsequent tenure of Claudio Abbado, who became artistic director in 1994.

In February 2010, allegations of financial scandal and embezzling arose against the then-executive director of the Easter Festival, Michael Dewitte. The scandal widened after Klaus Kretschmer, the technical director of the Salzburg Festival, was similarly accused, and later found severely injured in Salzburg after a reported suicide attempt.  Both Dewitte and Kretschmer were dismissed.  Peter Alward was then named the new managing director of the Easter Festival.

In May 2011, the Berlin Philharmonic decided to leave the Salzburg Easter Festival as orchestra in residence   In June 2011, the Easter Festival announced the appointment of the Staatskapelle Dresden as its new resident orchestra, and its Chief Conductor Christian Thielemann as its new artistic director, as of the 2013 season.

Since 1 July 2015, the cultural manager, composer and conductor Peter Ruzicka has been the managing director an Intendant of the Salzburg Easter Festival, following Peter Alward and Bernd Gaubinger.

References

External links
Official Salzburg Easter Festival website (in English)

See also
List of opera festivals

Opera festivals
Music for Easter
Easter Festival
1967 establishments in Austria
Recurring events established in 1967
Herbert von Karajan
Classical music festivals in Austria
Easter Festival, Salzburg
Spring (season) events in Austria